Brampton Centre is a provincial electoral district in central Ontario, Canada that elects one Member of the Legislative Assembly of Ontario. It was originally created in 1999 from Brampton North and Brampton South. It was abolished in 2007 into Brampton West and Brampton—Springdale.  For the 2018 election, it was re-created from Bramalea—Gore—Malton, Brampton—Springdale, and Mississauga—Brampton South.

The former riding included Brampton west of Dixie Road and east of a line following McLaughlin Road to Bovaird Drive to Main Street to Steeles Avenue to Kennedy Road.

Members of Provincial Parliament

Election results

2018–present

1999–2007

References 

Ontario provincial electoral districts
Politics of Brampton